Lincoln County may refer to:

Australia
Lincoln County, New South Wales
the former name of Lincoln Land District, Tasmania

Canada
Lincoln County, Ontario, one of the historic counties of Ontario

United Kingdom
The archaic term "County of Lincoln" refers to Lincolnshire in modern usage

United States
Lincoln County, Arkansas 
Lincoln County, Colorado 
Lincoln County, Georgia 
Lincoln County, Idaho 
Lincoln County, Kansas 
Lincoln County, Kentucky 
Lincoln County, Maine 
Lincoln County, Minnesota 
Lincoln County, Mississippi 
Lincoln County, Missouri 
Lincoln County, Montana 
Lincoln County, Nebraska 
Lincoln County Sheriff's Office (Nebraska)
Lincoln County, Nevada 
Lincoln County, New Mexico 
Lincoln County, North Carolina 
Lincoln County, Oklahoma 
Lincoln County, Oregon 
Lincoln County, South Dakota 
Lincoln County, Tennessee 
Lincoln County, Washington 
Lincoln County, West Virginia 
Lincoln County, Wisconsin 
Lincoln County, Wyoming

Other uses 
Lincoln County (song), a song by Dave Davies which reached #15 in the UK charts in 1968
Lincoln County War, New Mexico

See also
Lincoln Parish, Louisiana, United States

United States county name disambiguation pages